Getulia is a genus of snout moths described by Émile Louis Ragonot in 1888.

Species
Getulia fulviplagella Hampson, 1901
Getulia institella Ragonot, 1888
Getulia maculosa Balinsky, 1994
Getulia semifuscella Ragonot, 1893

References

Phycitinae
Taxa named by Émile Louis Ragonot
Pyralidae genera